The European Parliament election of 1989 took place on 18 June 1989.

Christian Democracy was the largest party in Veneto with 43.8%, while the Italian Communist Party came distant second with 18.5%

Results

Source: Regional Council of Veneto

Elections in Veneto
1989 elections in Italy
European Parliament elections in Italy
1989 European Parliament election